Pingtan is a town in Dachuan District, Dazhou, Sichuan province, China. , it administers Pingtan Residential Community and the following five villages: 
Beiyakou Village
Dinglong Village
Shuitongba Village
Shifeng Village
Jingu Village

See also 
 List of township-level divisions of Sichuan

References 

Township-level divisions of Sichuan
Dazhou